Eric Michels (July 2, 1964 – August 17, 2018) was an American businessman and film actor. He was a human resources executive at the energy company SSE.

Early life
Michels was born in 1964, in the U.S. and moved to Britain in the 1980s.

Career
His acting credits include playing Staff Sergeant James in World War Z (2013), FBI Operative in Jack Ryan: Shadow Recruit (2014), and was a James Bond extra playing a cocktail party guest in Skyfall in 2012.

Personal life
Michels was married  and had three children, but the marriage broke up in 2004 and he divorced in 2010.

Murder
Michels was found dead at his home in Chessington on August 18, 2018 by his daughter. He had been murdered in the early hours of August 17 by Gerald Matovu, having been targeted on Grindr. Matovu had written a message to Michels' 14-year-old daughter saying "Hello hun im a little busy talk soon". Matovu, who had previously been convicted of supplying GHB to the serial killer Stephen Port, was found guilty of the murder in July 2019. He was sentenced to life imprisonment with a minimum term of 31 years.

Filmography
 Jack Ryan: Shadow Recruit (2014) as FBI Operative
 World War Z (2013) as Staff Sergeant James
 Skyfall (2012) as Cocktail Party Guest
 First the Bird Fell (2011) as Kenneth Taylor

References

External links
 

1964 births
2018 deaths
Drug-related deaths in the United Kingdom
Male actors from Portland, Maine
Businesspeople from Portland, Maine
Assassinated businesspeople
American emigrants to the United Kingdom
20th-century American businesspeople